Barnes City is a city in Mahaska and Poweshiek counties in the U.S. state of Iowa. The population was 156 at the 2020 census.

Geography
Barnes City is located at  (41.508248, -92.468980).

Demographics

2010 census
As of the census of 2010, there were 176 people, 88 households, and 47 families living in the city. The racial makeup of the city was 99.4% White and 0.6% Native American.

There were 88 households, of which 17.0% had children under the age of 18 living with them, 42.0% were married couples living together, 5.7% had a female householder with no husband present, 5.7% had a male householder with no wife present, and 46.6% were non-families. 40.9% of all households were made up of individuals, and 13.6% had someone living alone who was 65 years of age or older. The average household size was 2.00 and the average family size was 2.68.

The median age in the city was 49.2 years. 17.6% of residents were under the age of 18; 7.4% were between the ages of 18 and 24; 20.4% were from 25 to 44; 34.7% were from 45 to 64; and 19.9% were 65 years of age or older. The gender makeup of the city was 52.3% male and 47.7% female.

2000 census
As of the census of 2000, there were 201 people, 92 households, and 50 families living in the city. The racial makeup of the city was 99.50% White and 0.50% African American.

There were 92 households, out of which 27.2% had children under the age of 18 living with them, 39.1% were married couples living together, 8.7% had a female householder with no husband present, and 44.6% were non-families. 37.0% of all households were made up of individuals, and 20.7% had someone living alone who was 65 years of age or older. The average household size was 2.18 and the average family size was 2.86.

In the city, the population was spread out, with 25.9% under the age of 18, 6.5% from 18 to 24, 23.4% from 25 to 44, 27.4% from 45 to 64, and 16.9% who were 65 years of age or older. The median age was 40 years. For every 100 females, there were 116.1 males. For every 100 females age 18 and over, there were 104.1 males.

The median income for a household in the city was $29,583, and the median income for a family was $32,321. Males had a median income of $31,250 versus $21,250 for females. The per capita income for the city was $14,135. About 14.0% of families and 20.7% of the population were below the poverty line, including 43.5% of those under the age of eighteen and 5.9% of those 65 or over.

Education
The North Mahaska Community School District operates local public schools.

References

Cities in Iowa
Cities in Mahaska County, Iowa
Cities in Poweshiek County, Iowa